Kuku Kohli (born Avtar Kohli) is a director, writer, editor and screenwriter of Bollywood Films. He was born in Peshawar. He is known to give Ajay Devgan his first break in Bollywood in the movie Phool Aur Kaante.

Career
Early in his career, he worked under Raj Kapoor for many years where he learned his skills.
Kuku Kohli has been in the film industry for more than 30 years.
He was the second unit director of the film Betaab  which was the launch pad of Sunny Deol and Amrita Singh and catapulted both into stardom as it was a golden jubilee film. Another film was Arjun starring Sunny Deol and Dimple Kapadia, was a silver jubilee film. The action sequences of this film shot by Kohli himself and are acclaimed to be among the best sequences ever shot. 
He, then, directed Phool Aur Kaante which achieved diamond jubilee status and made Ajay Devgan one of the most sought after stars of the country.  After this, he directed Kohraam starring Dharmendra, Suhaag starring Ajay Devgan, Akshay Kumar, Karishma Kapoor, Nagma was again a golden jubilee. Haqeeqat starring Ajay Devgan and Tabu was critically acclaimed and was a hit all over. It was nominated in 7 categories including best director for the Filmfare Awards. Kohli was also nominated as the best director of the year for the same film for the Screen Awards. His directorial venture was Zulmi starring Akshay Kumar and Twinkle Khanna. This film had also run successfully everywhere. 
His next film was Anari No.1 starring Govinda in a double role. This film was a huge success worldwide. Since then he had made Yeh Dil Aashiqanaa. Music maestros Nadeem-Shravan made a comeback into the industry with this film. His last directorial was Woh Tera Naam Tha starring Arjan Bajwa and Kanchi Kaul.

Personal life
He married actress Aruna Irani in 1990 and the couple has no children. This was his second marriage.

Filmography

Director
 Phool Aur Kaante (1991)
 Kohraam (1991)
 Suhaag (1994)
 Haqeeqat (1995)
 Anari No.1 (1999)
 Zulmi (1999)
 Yeh Dil Aashiqanaa (2002)
 Woh Tera Naam Tha (2004)

References

Hindi-language film directors
Indian male screenwriters
Living people
People from Peshawar
Punjabi people
Year of birth missing (living people)